An independence referendum was held in Aruba on 25 March 1977. In 1976 the Estates had approved a referendum on the island's status. Voters were given the choice of independence or remaining in the Netherlands Antilles, with over 95% voting in favour of the former. In 1983 the Treaty of The Hague planned independence for Aruba by 1996, and the island seceded from the Netherlands Antilles in 1986. However, in 1994 the plan for full independence was scrapped.

Results

References

1977 referendums
1977 in the Netherlands Antilles
Referendums in Aruba
Referendums in the Netherlands Antilles
Independence referendums
1977 in Aruba
March 1977 events in North America